Zinc nitride (Zn3N2) is an inorganic compound of zinc and nitrogen, usually obtained as (blue)grey crystals. It is a semiconductor. In pure form, it has the anti-bixbyite structure.

Chemical properties
Zinc nitride can be obtained by thermally decomposing zincamide (zinc diamine) in an anaerobic environment, at temperatures in excess of 200 °C. The by-product of the reaction is ammonia.
3Zn(NH2)2 → Zn3N2 + 4NH3

It can also be formed by heating zinc to 600 °C in a current of ammonia; the by-product is hydrogen gas.
3Zn + 2NH3 → Zn3N2 + 3H2 The decomposition of Zinc Nitride into the elements at the same temperature is a competing reaction. At 700 °C Zinc Nitride decomposes. It has also been made by producing an electric discharge between zinc electrodes in a nitrogen atmosphere. Thin films have been produced by chemical vapour deposition of Bis(bis(trimethylsilyl)amido]zinc with ammonia gas onto silica or ZnO coated alumina at 275 to 410 °C.

The crystal structure is anti-isomorphous with Manganese(III) oxide. (bixbyite).  The heat of formation is c.  per mol. It is a semiconductor with a reported bandgap of c. 3.2eV, however, a thin zinc nitride film prepared by electrolysis of molten salt mixture containing Li3N with a zinc electrode showed a band-gap of 1.01 eV.

Zinc nitride reacts violently with water to form ammonia and zinc oxide.
Zn3N2 + 3H2O → 3ZnO + 2NH3

Zinc nitride reacts with lithium (produced in an electrochemical cell) by insertion. The initial reaction is the irreversible conversion into LiZn in a matrix of beta-Li3N. These products then can be converted reversibly and electrochemically into LiZnN and metallic Zn.

See also
 Nitride
 Zinc nitrate

References

Further reading

External links
Material Safety Data Sheet from GFS Chemicals

zinc
nitride
II-V compounds
II-V semiconductors